The 2001–02 season is the sixth in the history of the Glasgow Warriors as a professional side. During this season the young professional side competed as Glasgow Rugby; reverting to their original professional title and dropping the Caledonian name inherited from the Caledonia Reds merger. However, the team gains the epithet Warriors at least from this season.

The 2001–02 season saw Glasgow Rugby compete in the competitions: the Welsh-Scottish League, the Celtic League and the European Champions Cup, the Heineken Cup.

Season Overview

Warriors name begins

At least from this season the team acquired its Warriors moniker – if not yet officially – and even becomes known as such to opposition fans. The Glasgow–Leinster semi-final programme, in Tony Ward's Leinster preview, states, "it adds to the competition enormously that the Glasgow Warriors remain on board thereby breaking the Irish provincial monopoly."

Team

Coaches

Head coach:  Richie Dixon 
Assistant coach:  Gordon Macpherson
Assistant coach:  Rob Moffat

Squad

Academy players

Player statistics

During the 2001–02 season, Glasgow have used 43 different players in competitive games. The table below shows the number of appearances and points scored by each player.

The 5 matches jointly held between the Welsh-Scottish League and the Celtic League are found only in the statistics for the Celtic League.

Staff movements

Coaches

Personnel In

Personnel Out

Player movements

Academy promotions

Player transfers

In

 Tom McLaren from  Bathurst RFC
 Calvin Howarth from  Edinburgh (loan)
 Chris Cusiter from  Watsonians
 Andrew Kelly from  Ayr RFC
 Kenny Sinclair from  Glasgow Hawks
 Andrew Hall from  Moseley
 Nathan Ross from  Queensland Reds

 Ben Prescott from  Aberdeen GSFP

Out

 Calvin Howarth to  Edinburgh (loan ends)
 Andrew Welsh to  Heriot's

Competitions

Pre-season and friendlies

Match 1

Newcastle Falcons: D Richardson; L Botham, J Noon, J Pattison, (G Maclure 57), V. 'Inga' Tuigamala; D Walder (M Stephenson 59), G Armstrong; M Ward, (G Peel 40), M Howe (C Balshem 72), M Hurter (G Graham 40), S Grimes (C Hamilton 61), H Vyvyan, J Dunbar (E Taipone 60), R Arnold (captain), A Mower

Glasgow Caledonians: Graeme Kiddie (R Kerr 70); J Steel, J McLaren (A Henderson 65), I McInroy (J Craig 71); T Hayes, A Nicol (captain); D Hilton (G Sykes 68), G Scott (G Bulloch 78), L Harrison, C Stewart, J White (S Griffiths 10), G Simpson, J Petrie (R Reid 79), G Flockhart

Match 2

Glasgow Caledonians:R Kerr; J Steel, I McInroy, A Henderson, J Craig; B Irving, C Black; G Sykes, G Scott, L Harrison, C Stewart, N Ross, R Reid, D Macfadyen, G Flockhart. Subs all used: B Prescott, A Hall, G Bulloch, G Perrett, G Simpson, T Hayes, J Petrie, R Reid

Subs used: R Hunter, P Grayson, C Hyndman, I Vass, S Brotherstone

European Champions Cup

Pool 5

Results

Round 1

Round 2

Round 3

Round 4

Round 5

Round 6

Magners Celtic League

The first season of the Celtic League was, from a slow start, a big success. Players, coaches and spectators all enjoyed the new tournament. In Ireland, especially, the Celtic League generated enormous interest.

Pool A

Results

Round 1

Round 2

Round 3 / Welsh-Scottish League Round 1

Round 4  / Welsh-Scottish League Round 2

Round 5  / Welsh-Scottish League Round 3

Round 6  / Welsh-Scottish League Round 4

Round 7 / Welsh-Scottish League Round 5

Knock out stages

Quarter-finals

Semi-finals

Welsh-Scottish League

This was the final year of the Welsh-Scottish League.

2001–02 League Table

Results

The first five Rounds were hosted jointly with this season's Celtic League and results are found in that section.

Round 6

Round 7

Round 8

Round 9

Round 10

Round 11

Round 12

Round 13

Round 14

Round 15

Round 16

Round 17

Round 18

Round 19

Round 20

References

2001-02
Glasgow
Glasgow
Glasgow